The Captives is a 1786 tragedy by the British writer John Delap.

The original Drury Lane cast included William 'Gentleman' Smith as Erragon, Robert Bensley as Hilladon, William Barrymore as Connal, John Philip Kemble as Everalin, Charlotte Tidswell as Virgin, Fanny Kemble as Minla and Sarah Siddons as Malvina.

References

Bibliography
 Nicoll, Allardyce. A History of English Drama 1660-1900: Volume III. Cambridge University Press, 2009.
 Hogan, C.B (ed.) The London Stage, 1660-1800: Volume V''. Southern Illinois University Press, 1968.

1786 plays
British plays
Tragedy plays
West End plays